Reliance may refer to:

Companies 

 Reliance Controls, an American electrical products company founded in 1909 in Wisconsin
 Reliance Home Comfort, a Canadian water heater rental and HVAC service company
 Reliance Industries, an Indian conglomerate holding headed by Mukesh Ambani:
 Reliance Digital
 Reliance Jio
 Reliance Fresh
 Reliance Industrial Infrastructure
 Reliance Institute of Life Sciences
 Reliance Logistics
 Reliance Petroleum
 Reliance Retail, retail business wing
 Reliance Solar
 Reliance Anil Dhirubhai Ambani Group, another Indian conglomerate headed by Anil Ambani:
 Reliance Capital
 Reliance Communications
 Reliance Entertainment
 Reliance Health
 Reliance Infrastructure, private power utility and construction
 Reliance MediaWorks
 Reliance Power
 Reliance Insurance
 Reliance Computer Corporation, former name of ServerWorks, a fabless semiconductor company

Places

United States 

 Reliance, Delaware and Maryland
 Reliance, South Dakota
 Reliance, Tennessee
 Reliance, Wyoming

Transport craft 

 Reliance (automobile), produced from 1903 to 1907
 Reliance (L 6), a World War II US Navy Goodyear L class blimp 
 Reliance (skipjack), a Chesapeake Bay skipjack built in 1904
 Reliance (yacht), America's Cup race winner in 1903
 , a merchant ship built at Coringa, British India  that became a whaler and wrecked in 1836
 USCGC Reliance (WMEC-615), a United States Coast Guard cutter
 HMS Reliance, name of multiple British ships of the Royal Navy

Other uses 

 Reliance (horse), a Thoroughbred racehorse
 Detrimental reliance, another name for the legal concept of estoppel

See also 

 Reliant (disambiguation)